Corporal Robert M. Cox (March 19, 1845–October 26, 1932) was an American soldier who fought in the American Civil War. Cox received the country's highest award for bravery during combat, the Medal of Honor, for his action during the Battle of Vicksburg in Mississippi on May 22, 1863. He was honored with the award on December 31, 1892.

Biography
Cox was born in Guernsey County, Ohio, on March 19, 1845, to William Cox and Mary Carver. He married Sara Bryt and had the following children: Minnie Cox, Arminda Cox, Lida Cox, Eliza Cox, Jessie Cox, Ella Cox, Robert Cox, Christine Cox, and Delena Cox. He enlisted into the 55th Illinois Infantry during the American Civil War. He died on October 26, 1932, and his remains are interred at the Prairie City Cemetery in Illinois.

Medal of Honor citation

See also
List of American Civil War Medal of Honor recipients: A–F

Notes

References

The Civil War Archive

External links
 The Story of the Fifty-fifth Regiment Illinois Volunteer Infantry in the Civil War
 Benton Barracks, The Missouri Civil War Museum
 55th Illinois Infantry at Vicksburg
 Vicksburg Medal of Honor Recipients

1845 births
1932 deaths
People of Illinois in the American Civil War
Union Army officers
United States Army Medal of Honor recipients
American Civil War recipients of the Medal of Honor